Cortinarius atrotomentosus is a fungus native to Florida in the southeastern United States, where it grows in association with  southern live oak (Quercus virginiana). It was described in 2015 by Emma Harrower and colleagues, and is closely related to the northern hemisphere species Cortinarius violaceus.

See also
List of Cortinarius species

References

External links

atrotomentosus
Fungi described in 2015
Fungi of North America